Shāh Nimatullāh or Shāh Ni'matullāh Wali, ( Shāh Ne'matullāh-i Valī), also spelled as Ne'matollah and Ni'matallah was the spiritual leader or Qutb of the Ni'matullah Order in Iran from the 14th and 15th centuries.  He is revered by Sunni Islam as a saint and by the Ni'matullāhī tariqa, who consider him their founder.

Biography

Born in Aleppo, Syria (or around Kerman, Iran according to some historians), Ni’mattullah traced his own descent from the seventh Imam Musa al-Kadhim, in both a poetic work as well as an epistle reproduced by his biographers ‘Abd al-Razzāq Kirmānī and ‘Abd al-‘Azīz Wā’iẓ.  Ni'matullah travelled widely through the Muslim world, learning the philosophies of many masters, but not finding a personal teacher he could dedicate himself to. Ni'matullah studied the writings of the great Sufi philosopher and mystic Ibn ʿArabī.

Ni'matullah met Abdollah Yafe'i Suhrawardiyya in Mecca and subsequently became his disciple. He studied intensely with his teacher for seven years. Spiritually transformed, he was sent out for a second round of travels; this time as a realized teacher.

Ni'matullah temporarily resided near Samarkand, along the great Central Asian Silk Road. It was here that he met the conqueror Tamerlane, but in order to avoid conflict, Ni'matullah soon left and eventually settled in the Baloch region of Kerman. His shrine is in nearby Mahan.

By the time Ni'matullah died, his fame had spread throughout Persia and India, (Though his presence is not much noted in India) and it is said he initiated hundreds of thousands of followers in the path now known by his name.

Ni'matullah's son Shah Khalilullah was the next qutb (master) of the Nimatullahi order. On the invitation of Sultan Ahmed Shah Al Wali Bahamani Of Bidar Sultanate Deccan to Shah Nimatullah Wali, he replied "I am 104 yrs old, I can not come, I am sending my son Shah Khalilullah "  to Deccan (around 1430 C.E).

The silsilah (spiritual lineage) of the Nimatulli then moved to Ashtoor outside Bidar in the Deccan. Before Shah his brother Shah Nurullah came to Bidar and was later married to the Sultan's daughter. The place where the Sultan received Shah is now Khalilabad outside Bidar. The Sultan saw Shah in his dream and wished that the saint come to Bidar. This dream according to many history books was realized, as when he received Shah he told his counsels, "If this is the same person I saw in my dream he should be carrying an octagon -shaped head cap”, and hence he was satisfied when Shah Khalilullah presented him with the cap. Today, even the Tomb of Shah is octagonal.

Poetry
Shah N'imatullah Wali left a Persian language diwan. A famous ode attributed to Shah Nimatullah Wali, with the rhyme Mey Beenum,  has been published by Shah Ismail Dehlvi in his book Al-Arba'in fi Ahwal-al-Mahdiyin (1851)

Shrine

Shah Nimatullah Wali's shrine is in Mahan, Iran.

Tomb

Shah Khalilullah's tomb is located outside Bidar fort and known as "chokundi". Today it is under the authority of the Archaeological Survey of India. Shah Khalilullah was succeeded by numerous other qutbs (masters) including Shah Mir Mahmud Deccani, Shams al Din Deccani and Reza Ali Shah Deccani. The silsilah moved back to Iran after the Sufi master Reza Ali Shah Deccani's ordered his disciple Ali Shah Deccani in the year 1194 AH, nearing the end of Karim Khan Zand's dynasty to depart to Iran with his family and entered Shiraz. Not long after the establishment of the Safawid state, the Ni’matullahi order publicly declared itself Shia. His tomb is located in Kerman, Iran. It is a beautiful work of art, Natural plant colors decorate the walls of his private chamber, the place where he would stay and fast for 40 days and nights. It is also the place from which he would get inspiration to write his predictions.

Notes

Bibliography 
 
 Masters of the Path: A History of the Masters of the Nimatullahi Sufi Order by Dr. Javad Nurbakhsh, Khaniqahi Nimatullahi Publications, New York and London, 2nd Edition, 1993,  and 
 Kings of Love - The History and Poetry of the Ni'matullahi Sufi Order by Nasrollah Pourjavady and Peter Lamborn Wilson, Imperial Iranian Academy of Philosophy, Tehran, 1978,  and 

1330 births
1431 deaths
Hashemite people
Iranian centenarians
Iranian poets
Iranian Sufis
Men centenarians
Nimatullahi order
Persian-language poets
Sufi poets
Founders of Sufi orders
15th-century Iranian people
14th-century Iranian people